Karel Štěpánek (29 October 189925 December 1980) was a Czech actor who spent many years in Austria and generally played German roles onscreen. In 1940 he moved to Britain and spent much of the rest of his career acting there.

Partial filmography
 A Love, A Thief, A Department Store (1928)
 Berlin-Alexanderplatz (1931)
 Here's Berlin (1932) as Max
 Five from the Jazz Band (1932) as Jean
 Spione im Savoy-Hotel (1932) as Jackson
 A Song for You (1933) as Theo Bruckner
 Waltz War (1933) as Kellner Leopold
 Hermine and the Seven Upright Men (1935) as Ruckstuhl, Grundstückspekulant
 Die Werft zum Grauner Hecht (1935) as Ladewig
 Der Auβenseiter (1935) as Otto Burian
 Stronger Than Regulations (1936) as Robert Wendland
The Unknown (1936) as Manager at Regina's
 Signal in the Night (1937) as Korporal Tschepski
  (1937) as Attaché / Orlovsky

 Klatovsti dragouni (1937) as Dance Master
 The Stars Shine (1938) as Oberbeleuchter Brandt
 Narren im Schnee (1939) as Rolf Pinkenkötter
 War es der im 3. Stock? (1939) as Georg Kilby
  (1939) as Lawyer
 Hotel Sacher (1939) as Franz
 Three Fathers for Anna (1939)
 The Leghorn Hat (1939) as Felix
 Die Kluge Schwiegermutter (1939) as Hans Giebel
 Drei Väter un Anna (1939) as Matschek
 Alles Schwindel (1940) as Clubdiener
 Women Are Better Diplomats (1941) as Kellner
 Secret Mission (1942) as Major Lang
 Tomorrow We Live (1943) as Seitz
 Escape to Danger (1943) as Franz von Brinkman
 They Met in the Dark (1943) as Riccardo
 The Captive Heart (1946) as Forster
 Counterblast (1948) as Professor Inman, Nazi Psychiatrist
 Broken Journey (1948) as Swiss Officer (uncredited)
 The Fallen Idol (1948) as First Secretary
 Conspirator (1949) as Radek
 The Third Man (1949) as Actor at Josefstadt Theatre (uncredited)
 Give Us This Day (1949) as Jaroslav
 Golden Arrow (1949) as Schroeder
 Cairo Road (1950) as Edouardo Pavlis
 State Secret (1950) as Dr. Revo
 The Third Visitor (1951) as Richard Carling
 No Highway (1951) as Mannheim (uncredited)
 Walk East on Beacon (1952) as Alexi Laschenkov / Gregory Anders
 Affair in Trinidad (1952) as Walters
 City Beneath the Sea (1953) as Dwight Trevor
 Never Let Me Go (1953) as Commisar
 Rough Shoot (1953) as Diss
 Dangerous Cargo (1954) as Pliny
 Tale of Three Women (1954) as Alfred Dykemann (segment "Final Twist' story)
 A Prize of Gold (1955) as Zachmann
 Secret Venture (1955) as Zelinsky
 The Cockleshell Heroes (1955) as Assistant Gestapo Officer
 Man of the Moment (1955) as Lom
 Private's Progress (1956) as German Officer (uncredited)
 The Man in the Road (1956) as Dmitri Balinkev
 Anastasia (1956) as Mikhail Vlados
 The Traitor (1957) as Friederich Suderman
 West of Suez (1957) as Langford
 Operation Amsterdam (1959) as Diamond Merchant (uncredited)
 Our Man in Havana (1959) as Dr. Braun
 Sink the Bismarck! (1960) as Admiral Günther Lütjens
 I Aim at the Stars (1960) as Captain Dornberger 
 Three Moves to Freedom (1960) as Baranow
 Terror After Midnight (1962) as Vater Stoddard
 Devil Doll (1964) as Dr. Heller
 Operation Crossbow (1965) as Prof. Hoffer
 Licensed to Kill (1965) as Henrik Jacobsen
 The Heroes of Telemark (1965) as Prof. Hartmuller
 Sperrbezirk (1966) as Inspector Wagner
 The Frozen Dead (1967) as General Lubeck
 Murderers Club of Brooklyn (1967) as Dyers
 Before Winter Comes (1969) as Count Kerassy
 The File of the Golden Goose (1969) as Mueller
 The Games (1970) as Kubitsek
 Been Down So Long It Looks Like Up to Me (1971) as Count Derassy (final film role)

References

External links
 

1899 births
1980 deaths
Actors from Brno
Czech male film actors
Czechoslovak emigrants to Austria
Czechoslovak emigrants to the United Kingdom
Czechoslovak male film actors
People from the Margraviate of Moravia